Dwayne D. Gremler is a social scientist, academic, and author. He is a Professor of Marketing, Distinguished Teaching Professor, and Distinguished Research Professor in the Schmidthorst College of Business at Bowling Green State University. He is a co-author of the textbook Services Marketing: Integrating Customer Focus Across the Firm, now in its 8th edition.

Gremler’s research interests span the fields of marketing with emphasis on service marketing and management, and focuses on the topics of emotion management in services, customer-employee rapport in service interactions, word-of-mouth communication, customer loyalty, and service guarantees.

Gremler has been appointed as Research Faculty at Arizona State University’s Center for Services Leadership, as an Associate Member of Center for Service Management Loughborough University, and as Visiting International Professor at the University of Münster.

Education
Gremler graduated in Mathematics from Arizona State University in 1980. Later  on, he enrolled for an M.B.A. in Marketing, and graduated in 1990. In 1995, he completed his education at Arizona State University with a Ph.D. in Marketing under the supervision of Stephen W. Brown. His dissertation was titled, "The Effect of Satisfaction, Switching Costs, and Interpersonal Bonds on Service Loyalty".

Career
Gremler started his academic career at Arizona College of the Bible as an Instructor (and Basketball Coach) in 1987. After completing his Ph.D., he served as an Assistant Professor of Marketing at the University of Idaho from 1995 till 2000. Subsequently, he was appointed as an Associate Professor of Marketing at Bowling Green State University in 2000, and was promoted to Professor of Marketing in 2007. He is a former Fulbright Scholar who taught service marketing at the University of Maastricht. He is a Visiting International Professor at the University of Münster, and on the Research Faculty of the Center for Services Leadership in the W. P. Carey School of Business at Arizona State University.

In 2015, he was appointed by the Bowling Green State University Board of Trustees as Distinguished Teaching Professor  and, in 2022, as Distinguished Research Professor. He is the only professor at Bowling Green State University to receive both appointments. He served for three years on the Academic Council for the American Marketing Association. In addition to that, he was the Chair of American Marketing Association’s Services Marketing Special Interest Group from 2002 to 2003, served for two years as the Mentoring Coordinator of this group. He has also served as an Associate Editor for the Journal of Service Research since 2014.

Research
Gremler has authored over 100 publications, including peer-reviewed journals, book chapters, and conference papers. His research focuses on service management and particularly addresses emotion management in services, customer-employee rapport in service interactions, word-of-mouth communication, customer loyalty in service organizations, and service guarantees.

Service management
With a focus on relationship marketing, Gremler's works have explored how to manage customer relational benefits in services. His research has identified benefits customers receive from having developed relationships with service firms, and classified them into three primary categories: confidence, social, and special treatment benefits. His later research also evaluated relational benefits and relationship quality and showed that the concepts of customer satisfaction, social, and confidence benefits tend to impact relationship marketing outcomes. The role of customer engagement both psychological and behavioral engagement has been identified with his more recent research, which has reported that behavioral customer engagement is influenced by psychological customer engagement.

Emotion management in services
Gremler’s more recent research focuses on the role of emotions in service interactions. One of his articles examines emotional contagion—the idea that customers can catch the emotions displayed by customer contact employees. That research study examined the impact of emotion contagion and emotional labor of employees on customers’ emotions in service industry. The study found that the extent of smiling does not have any effect on customers’ emotions, however the authenticity of employee’s emotional labor tends to influence the customers emotions. His research explains how emotions exhibited during service encounters get shared, revealing the need for service firms to establish positive encounters for the benefits of all the parties involved. In addition, his research explains how companies should train their service employees to ensure the protection and well-being of customers. In studying both positive and negative emotional contagion effects and the use of emotional labor in a personalized service setting, this research highlights the importance of understanding the potential influence of customer preservice emotions and the presence of an emotion cycle during service delivery.

Gremler and his co-authors reveal how service firms can help their employees anticipate and respond to customers in a bad mood, which in turn can provide emotional reassurance for those customers. Other research proposes training employees to exhibit not just technical competence but also emotional competence. Such efforts have strong influences on the well-being and emotional health of service employees, who also gain a sense of support from their employers. In turn, customers enjoy enhanced outcomes of service interactions that ensure their critical needs are being met in a pleasant, safe, and friendly setting.

Customer-employee rapport in service interactions
In a 2000 article, Gremler and Kevin Gwinner examined one specific aspect of customer-employee relationships, rapport, that they contend is particularly salient in service businesses characterized by a high number of interpersonal interactions. In that study, they find support for two empirically distinct dimensions of rapport (i.e., enjoyable interaction and personal connection). They also find a positive relationship between these dimensions and satisfaction, loyalty intentions, and word-of-mouth communication—findings. His later research on this topic identifies employee behaviors that help to cultivate rapport with customers.

Word-of-mouth communication
Gremler’s research has also focused on word-of-mouth (WoM) communication. A highly cited research project identifies the motivation factors which drive digital WoM communication. On opinion sharing platforms, the desire for social interaction, economic incentives, and a basic concern for others were found to drive the (electronic) WoM communication of goods and services to other customers. He and his colleagues also noted that firms may need to incorporate strategies to strengthen and increase the eWoM behavior. Together with Kevin Gwinner and Stephen Brown, his research also indicates a significant relationship between WoM behavior and interpersonal relationships between customers and employees. This research suggests customer WoM behavior can be encouraged by the strengthening of interpersonal relationships between employees and customers. While investigating customer-employee relationships, his research focused on rapport in service relationships, particularly the aspects of enjoyable interaction and personal connection. The research findings highlight rapport’s benefits; that is, service firms can benefit from strong customer-employee rapport, as a significant relationship was found between rapport and customer loyalty, as well as between rapport and WoM communication.

Customer loyalty in service organizations
Gremler’s early research focused on customer loyalty and retention in service settings. Given the lack of research on service loyalty in the early 1990s, he and Stephen Brown proposed a conceptual model of service loyalty and provided insights into how loyalty impacts customers and service organizations. Moreover, his work on service loyalty analyzed the factors which are associated with it, and highlighted the importance of building relationships with customers. During the examination of the "loyalty ripple effect" and the potential impact loyal customers can have on a company, his research emphasized that loyal customers can benefit the firm beyond the revenue they generate. The findings suggest that by engaging in word-of-mouth communication, loyal customers can create value and reduce costs. While studying customer loyalty, his research suggested that commercial friendships (between customer and employees) can serve as a switching barrier and thus can serve as a key driver of customer loyalty to service firms.

Service guarantees
Gremler’s research has also examined service guarantees. He and his colleague, Michael McCollough, proposed offering service guarantees in their business classes at the University of Idaho, enabling them to examine the impact of such guarantees in an educational setting. In particular, they empirically investigated the presence of a "money-back guarantee" in classes they offered to assess student and faculty attitudes toward such an offering; this research revealed that both groups were alike in terms of believing a service guarantee can be helpful in increasing accountability of both faculty and students. His later research presented a synthesis of service guarantee research, which was followed by an event study that examined the effect of a service guarantee on a firm’s market value when new service guarantee announcements are made to the public.

Awards and honors
2006 – J. William Fulbright Scholarship, Bureau of Educational and Cultural Affairs of the U.S. Department of State
2009 – Outstanding Marketing Teacher Award, Academy of Marketing Science
2012 – Best Service Research Paper in 2011 for article entitled “Extreme Makeover: Short- and Long-Term Effects of a Remodeled Servicescape”, American Marketing Association’s Services Special Interest Group
2014 – Christopher Lovelock Career Contributions Award, American Marketing Association’s Services Special Interest Group
2015 – Distinguished Teaching Professor, Bowling Green State University
2016 – Audi Visiting Professor, Catholic University of Eichstätt-Ingolstadt, Germany
2018 – Industry Excellence Award, College of Business, Bowling Green State University
2022 – Distinguished Research Professor, Bowling Green State University

Bibliography

Books
Services Marketing: Integrating Customer Focus Across the Firm, 8th Edition (2024) ISBN 9781260260526

Selected articles
Gwinner, Kevin P., Dwayne D. Gremler, and Mary Jo Bitner (1998), “Relational Benefits in Services Industries: The Customer’s Perspective,” Journal of the Academy of Marketing Science, 26(2), 101–114.
Gremler, Dwayne D. and Kevin P. Gwinner (2000), “Customer-employee Rapport in Service Relationships,” Journal of Service Research, 3(1), 82–104.
Hennig-Thurau, Thorsten, Kevin P. Gwinner, and Dwayne D. Gremler (2002), “Understanding Relationship Marketing Outcomes: An Integration of Relational Benefits and Relationship Quality,” Journal of Service Research, 4(3), 230–247.
Gremler, Dwayne D. (2004), “The Critical Incident Technique in Service Research,” Journal of Service Research, 7(1), 65–89.
Hennig-Thurau, Thorsten, Kevin P. Gwinner, Gianfranco Walsh, and Dwayne D. Gremler (2004), “Electronic Word-of-mouth via Consumer-opinion Platforms: What Motivates Consumers to Articulate Themselves on the Internet?” Journal of Interactive Marketing, 18(1), 38–52.
Hennig-Thurau, Thorsten, Markus Groth, Michael Paul, and Dwayne D. Gremler (2006), “Are All Smiles Created Equal?  How Employee-Customer Emotional Contagion and Emotional Labor Impact Service Relationships,” Journal of Marketing, 70 (3), 58-73.

References

Living people
Arizona State University alumni
University of Idaho faculty
Arizona State University faculty
21st-century American academics
Bowling Green State University faculty
American social scientists
Year of birth missing (living people)